Chorebus lateralis is a species of diurnal parasitoid wasp.

References

External links 

 

lateralis
Insects described in 1839